The 1865 Alabama gubernatorial election took place on November 6, 1865, in order to elect the governor of Alabama. Whig Robert M. Patton won with a narrow plurality of the votes, beating Democrat Michael J. Bulger by about 4,000 votes.

This was the last time a Whig won any election in US history.

Election

References

Alabama gubernatorial elections
1865 Alabama elections
Alabama
November 1865 events